Ajmera (Urdu, Pashto: اجميره)is the capital city of Battagram District in Khyber Pakhtunkhwa Province of Pakistan.

It comprises many small villages. These include Chota Mera, Lachmera, Dehran, Gandori, Amlok, Mera Faqeer Khan, Baig pate, Beedadi, Chappargram, Lower Medan, Noshehra, Palango Tamai, and Ajmera itself. It is located at 34°40'20N 73°1'10E and has an altitude of 1068 metres (3507 feet).

References

Union councils of Battagram District
Populated places in Battagram District